

Alwig (or Alwigh) was a medieval Bishop of Lindsey.

Alwig was consecrated in 733. He died in 750.

Citations

References

External links
 

Bishops of Lindsey
750 deaths
Year of birth unknown